Patrick Adamson (1537–1592) was a Scottish divine, and Archbishop of St Andrews from 1575.

Life
Adamson was born at Perth where his father, Patrick Adamson, a burgess became Dean of Merchant Guildry.

Adamson studied philosophy at the University of St Andrews where he graduated as MA, later receiving a doctorate.

Residence in France
After serving as Minister of Ceres, Fife for three years, in 1565, Adamson travelled to Paris as tutor to the eldest son of Sir James MacGill, the Lord Clerk Register (or Clericus Rotulorum of Scotland), serving there initially as a Knights Hospitaller chaplain.

In June 1566 Adamson wrote a Latin poem on the birth of Prince James for Mary, Queen of Scots and her King consort, Lord Darnley; by describing the young James as serenissimus princeps "of France and England" which, leaked by a rival to Charles IX of France's courtiers, caused offence resulting in six months' detention in France. He was released only through the intercession of Queen Mary and other senior Scots nobility, thereafter relocating with his pupil to read Law at the University of Bourges.

At the time of the 1572 St. Bartholomew's Day Massacre in Paris, Adamson had been living under cover at a tavern in Bourges for seven months, whose aged landlord was later reportedly thrown from the roof for offering charity to such a "heretic".  Adamson's time at this "sepulchre" was spent composing a Latin poetical version of the Book of Job and a tragedy of Herod the Great, also written in the Latin language.

Return to Scotland
In 1572, Adamson returned to Scotland becoming Minister of Paisley. In 1575 he was appointed by the General Assembly as one of the commissioners to settle the jurisdiction and policy of the church. As Moderator in the following year, he together with his successor, David Lyndsay, presented the Church Assembly proceedings to Lord Morton, Regent of Scotland.

In 1576, Adamson's consecration as Archbishop of St Andrews gave rise to a protracted conflict among the Presbyterian faction in the Assembly.  Adamson had already published a catechism of Latin verse dedicated to James VI, which work was highly acclaimed even by his opponents, as well as a Latin translation of the Scots Confession of Faith.

In 1578, Adamson submitted himself before the General Assembly, procuring a brief respite but the following year fresh accusations were brought against him.  During these turbulent political times, he took refuge in St Andrews Castle, where a so-called "wise woman", Alison Pearson, who was later burned for witchcraft, cured his apparent "serious illness".

Excommunication
In 1583, Adamson returned to public service by being posted as Scottish ambassador to the Court of St James's of Elizabeth I of England; whilst in London rumours were spread about his bad behaviour. On his return he implemented strong measures in parliament against Presbyterians, and consequently accusations of heresy followed with excommunication at a provincial synod held at St Andrews in April 1586; however at the next General Assembly this verdict was rescinded as being ultra vires.

In 1587 and 1588, however, fresh accusations were brought against Adamson, and again he was excommunicated, though afterwards on the inducement of a former adversary, Sir Andrew Melville, his sentence was remitted.  Meanwhile, Adamson had produced the Book of Lamentations, and the Book of Revelation in Latin verse which he dedicated to the king, but complained of his harsh treatment.  King James was unmoved by Adamson's representations and transferred the episcopal revenues to his new favourite, Ludovic, 2nd Duke of Lennox.

After falling from grace, Adamson spent the remaining three years of his life supported by charity.

Legacy

Adamson possessed many gifts, being learned and eloquent, but also had grave defects of character; however the "Recantation of Episcopacy (1590)" attributed to him is probably spurious.  His collected works, prefaced by a favourable panegyric, in the course of which it is said that "he was a miracle of nature, and rather seemed to be the immediate production of God Almighty than born of a woman", were published by his son-in-law, Thomas Wilson, in 1619.

An heraldic memorial to Adamson survives at the ancient cathedral of St Andrews.

By his wife Elizabeth née Arthur, Adamson had two sons, James and Patrick, and a daughter, Mariota, who married Sir Michael Balfour. His elder brothers, James and Henry, both served as Provost of Perth, and they were fathers of Henry and John Adamson respectively.

References

Further reading

External links

 History of St Leonards College, St Andrews
 www.electricscotland.com
 www.scotlandspast.org
 www.scottish-places.info
 www.virtualscotland.co.uk
 www.lyon-court.com
 www.AdamsonAncestry.com

1537 births
1592 deaths
People from Perth, Scotland
Alumni of the University of Glasgow
Scottish Roman Catholic priests
Alumni of the University of St Andrews
People associated with Fife
16th-century Latin-language writers
Scottish scholars and academics
Scottish religious writers
Scottish Calvinist and Reformed theologians
Chancellors of the University of St Andrews
Ambassadors of Scotland to England
Members of the Privy Council of Scotland
Members of the pre-1707 Parliament of Scotland
Moderators of the General Assembly of the Church of Scotland
16th-century Calvinist and Reformed ministers
Archbishops of St Andrews
16th-century Scottish theologians
Scottish bishops 1560–1638